The Boeing XP-9 (company Model 96) was the first monoplane fighter aircraft produced by the United States aircraft manufacturing company Boeing.  It incorporated sophisticated structural refinements that were influential in later Boeing designs. The sole prototype exhibited unsatisfactory characteristics with its lack of pilot visibility directly leading to its cancellation.

Design and development
The XP-9 was designed in 1928 to meet the requirements of a US Army request for a monoplane fighter. Its primary contribution to aircraft design was its semi-monocoque construction, which would become a standard for future aircraft. Boeing employed the structural features of the XP-9 into their contemporary P-12 biplane fighter when the P-12E variant incorporated a semi-monocoque metal fuselage structure similar to that of the XP-9. The undercarriage arrangement of the P-12C had also been first tried out on the XP-9 and then transferred into the production model.

Operational history
The prototype XP-9, marked A 028-386, was first flown on 18 November 1930. It had impressive stats on the specification sheet, but it quickly became apparent that its large (6 ft chord) wing, which was placed atop the fuselage directly in front of the pilot, obstructed downward visibility so badly that simple landing maneuvers were hazardous. Test pilots at the Army Test Centre at Wright Field found that the XP-9's inherent instability was so severe that immediate modifications were requested to increase the size of the vertical tail. An enlarged vertical tail surface with smooth metal skinning was introduced, but failed to effect any significant improvement, and this revised XP-9 was grounded for instructional airframe use in August 1931, after only 15 hours of test flying, due to the impossibility of its being landed safely.

Variants
Model 96, XP-9 one built
Y1P-9 option for five service test aircraft under the P-12D contract, option was not taken up

Operators (planned)

United States Army

Specifications (Boeing XP-9)

See also

References

Notes

Bibliography

 Eden, Paul and Moeng, Soph. The Complete Encyclopedia of World Aircraft. London: Amber Books Ltd., 2002. .
 Pedigree of Champions: Boeing Since 1916, Third Edition (booklet). Seattle, WA: The Boeing Company, 1969.

External links

United States Air Force Museum: Boeing XP-9

Boeing P-09
P-09, Boeing
Single-engined tractor aircraft
High-wing aircraft